Roman Hurej was a Polish luger who competed in the mid-1970s. He and Józef Pietrończyk won the bronze medal in the men's doubles event at the 1974 FIL European Luge Championships in Imst, Austria.

References

List of European luge champions 

Polish male lugers
Possibly living people
Year of birth missing
Place of birth missing (living people)